Drymaria cordata, the tropical chickweed, West Indian chickweed, or golondrina, is a species of flowering plant in the family Caryophyllaceae. It is native to moist habitats in Latin America and sub-Saharan Africa, and has been introduced to many places in the tropics and subtropics, including the southeast US, the Caribbean, the Indian Subcontinent, southern China, Japan, and a number of islands. It is known as one of the most aggressive weeds of the tropical and subtropical parts of the world.

References

Caryophyllaceae
Flora of Mexico
Flora of Central America
Flora of northern South America
Flora of western South America
Flora of the Galápagos Islands
Flora of Brazil
Flora of northern Chile
Flora of Northeast Argentina
Flora of Northwest Argentina
Flora of Paraguay
Flora of Uruguay
Flora of Guinea
Flora of Sierra Leone
Flora of Liberia
Flora of Ivory Coast
Flora of Nigeria
Flora of West-Central Tropical Africa
Flora of Sudan
Flora of Ethiopia
Flora of East Tropical Africa
Flora of Zambia
Flora of Zimbabwe
Flora of Malawi
Flora of Mozambique
Flora of the Cape Provinces
Flora of the Northern Provinces
Flora of KwaZulu-Natal
Plants described in 1819